The Monmouth Hawks college football team represents Monmouth University as an FCS independent. The Hawks currently compete as a member of the National Collegiate Athletic Association (NCAA) Division I Football Championship Subdivision. The program has had just one head coach since it began play in 1993.

Robert Morris has played 287 games over 26 seasons, appearing in three postseason games and two bowl games.

Key

Coaches

Notes

References

Monmouth Hawks

Monmouth Hawks football coaches